Gustav Rutopõld (December 3, 1875 in Nabala Parish, Harju County – January 7, 1936 in Tartu) was an Estonian Evangelical Lutheran Church clergyman and academic.
 
He studied at the Tallinn Kreisschool. In 1918 he graduated from Rakvere Gymnasium as an external student. In the same year he entered the Faculty of Theology at the University of Tartu, which he graduated in 1922. He was also a member of the Estonian Students' Society.

References 

1936 deaths
1875 births
Estonian Lutheran clergy
University of Tartu alumni
People from Rae Parish